Peter F. MacGregor (born February 24, 1966) is a Republican politician from Michigan currently serving as the Kent County Treasurer. He previously served in the Michigan Senate representing the 28th district and also was a former member of the Michigan House of Representatives representing northern Kent County. He is also a former trustee, planning commissioner, and supervisor of Cannon Township.

A graduate of the Eli Broad College of Business at Michigan State University, MacGregor is a former small business owner and is involved in several local organizations.

MacGregor announced his intention to run for the Michigan Senate in 2014 to replace Mark Jansen who could not run again due to term limits. He won in both 2014 and his 2018 reelection campaign.

In 2020, MacGregor stepped down to become Kent County Treasurer.

References

1966 births
Living people
County treasurers in Michigan
Republican Party members of the Michigan House of Representatives
Politicians from Detroit
People from Rockford, Michigan
Eli Broad College of Business alumni
Republican Party Michigan state senators
21st-century American politicians